This is a list of now defunct airlines from Botswana.

See also
 List of airlines of Botswana
 List of airports in Botswana

References

Botswana
Airlines
Airlines, defunct
Airlines